Andrea Brady (born 1974 in Philadelphia) is an American poet and lecturer at Queen Mary. She studied at Columbia University and the University of Cambridge Her academic work focuses on contemporary poetry and the early modern period. She is the curator of the Archive of the Now and the co-editor (with Keston Sutherland) of Barque Press.

Publications

Poetry
 Vacation of a Lifetime (Cambridge: Salt, 2001).
 Embrace (Glasgow: Object Permanence, 2005).
 Wildfire: A Verse Essay (San Francisco: Krupskaya, 2010).
 Mutability: Scripts for Infancy (Seagull Books, 2013)
 Cut from the Rushes (Hastings: Reality Street, 2013).
 Dompteuse (Toronto: Bookthug, 2014).
 The Strong Room (London: Crater Press, 2016).
 The Blue Split Compartments (forthcoming).

Criticism
 English Funerary Elegy in the Seventeenth Century: Laws in Mourning (2006) 
 The Uses of the Future in Early Modern Europe, co-ed. with Emily Butterworth (2009) 
 Poetry and Bondage: A History of Lyric and Constraint (forthcoming)

References

Further reading
 
 
 
 
 
 
 
 
 Keston Sutherland, University of Sussex: ‘Vocal Stupor 2: Notes on Love Poetry’, and Jonathan Clay, Birkbeck, University of London: ‘Andrea Brady’s ‘Saw Fit’: Poetic Innovation and Politics’ (New Readings of British Contemporary Poetry, University of Dundee, 3 June 2006).

External links

 Andrew Duncan. Andrea Brady Interview, The Argotist Online
 Nada Gordon (Fall 1999). Review of Liberties, readme 1
 Marianne Morris (April 2006). ‘Behind the Veil’: Review of Embrace Jacket 29
 John Sears (April 29, 2012). Andrea Brady's Wildfire — Generation in Destruction, temporel: revue littéraire & artistique 13 
 Vicky Sparrow (December 6, 2013). Review of Mutability: Scripts for Infancy, literateur.com
 Ashleigh Lambert (January 8, 2014). Review of Mutability: Scripts for Infancy, ''therumpus.net

1974 births
21st-century American poets
21st-century British poets
Academics of the University of London
Alumni of the University of Cambridge
American women poets
British women poets
British literary critics
British women literary critics
American literary critics
American women literary critics
Columbia University alumni
Living people
Writers from Philadelphia
21st-century American women writers
American women academics